Napoléon Alexandre Louis Joseph Berthier, 2nd Prince of Wagram (11 September 1810, Paris10 February 1887, Paris) was a French politician and nobleman. He was the son of Louis-Alexandre Berthier, 1st Prince of Wagram, and Duchess Maria Elisabeth in Bavaria (and by his mother, grandnephew of King Maximilian I of Bavaria).

Marriage and family 
On 29 June 1831, he married Zénaïde Françoise Clary (25 November 1812, Paris – 27 April 1884, Paris). She was the daughter of Nicolas Joseph Clary and Malcy Anne Jeanne Rougier. She was also the niece to Desiree 
Clary, former fiancé to Napoleon Bonaparte and the wife of jean-Baptiste Bernadotte - King Charles XIV of Sweden. 

They had three children:

 Malcy Louise Caroline Frédérique Berthier, Princess of Wagram (1832-1884), who married Joachim, 4th Prince Murat 

 Louis Philippe Marie Alexandre Berthier, 3rd Prince of Wagram (1836-1911)

 Elisabeth Alexandrine Maria Berthier, Princess of Wagram (1849-1932), who married Count Étienne-Guy de Turenne d'Aynac.

Ancestry

Bibliography

1810 births
1887 deaths
Politicians from Paris
Princes of Wagram
Members of the Chamber of Peers of the July Monarchy
French Senators of the Second Empire
French people of the Revolutions of 1848